Salle is a village and Haleshi Tuwachung Municipality Ward No.9 (Nepal)  in Khotang District in the Sagarmatha Zone of eastern Nepal. At the time of the 1991 Nepal census it had a population of 1,931 persons living in 357 individual households.

References

External links
UN map of the municipalities of Khotang District

Populated places in Khotang District